Lostwithiel railway station serves the town of Lostwithiel in Cornwall, England. Great Western Railway operates the station along with every other station in Cornwall.

The station is on the banks of the River Fowey in Cornwall. At the east end of the station is a level crossing while at the west end the line is carried over the river, beyond which is the junction for the Fowey branch which is now used by china clay trains only. Between the station and the river stand the remains of the Cornwall Railway workshops, converted and extended in 2004 as a housing development.

Lostwithiel's famous medieval bridge is just outside the station, with the town on the opposite bank of the river.

History
The station opened with the Cornwall Railway on 4 May 1859. A report at the time claimed that it

"is generally admitted to be the handsomest station on the line, and looks as gay and bright as fresh paint can make it. It consists, first, of a departure station, a wooden building covered by rusticated boarding, having a projecting verandah, extending eight feet on each side of the carriage approaches, and extending over the railway platform. This contains a spacious first class waiting room, second class ditto, ticket, and other necessary offices, and conveniences. Immediately opposite to this, is the arrival station, which is also of wooden erection, having spacious waiting rooms, and porter and lamp rooms. The roof also projects over the platform in a similar way to that of the departure station. A short distance lower down the line is a convenient goods shed, 75 feet long by 42 feet span of roof. Near to the departure station is the train shed, 100 feet long, in which, in addition to the engines employed on the line, it is intended to contain first, second, and third class carriages, in order to meet any extra requirements that may at any time arise."

The workshops had been established during the construction of the railway to prepare the timber needed for the wooden viaducts, stations and track. It expanded to also maintain the carriages and wagons of the railway and was retained for some years by the Great Western Railway when the two companies amalgamated on 1 July 1889.

The Lostwithiel and Fowey Railway opened for goods traffic on 1 June 1869. A more direct route from Par to Fowey stole most of the traffic and the trains from Lostwithiel were suspended on 1 January 1880. The Cornwall Railway subsequently leased a part of the line to store rolling stock. The line was reopened by the Cornwall Minerals Railway on 16 September 1895 for both goods and passengers. The passenger service was withdrawn on 4 January 1965 but the line remains open to carry china clay to the jetties at Fowey.

Sidings on the east side of the level crossing came into use on 30 April 1932 to handle milk train traffic from a new Nestle milk factory. It was later sold to Cow & Gate.

The Great Western Railway was nationalised into British Railways from 1 January 1948 which in turn was privatised in the 1990s. British Railways demolished the original station buildings and replaced them with a new booking office on the platform nearest the town, although these are no longer needed.

Lostwithiel signal box is situated at the northern end of Platform 1. Since the Bodmin Road Signal Box was closed, the sidings at Bodmin Parkway connecting to the Bodmin and Wenford Railway are controlled by the box here. It is also used to control the signals and level crossing.

Stationmasters

Edward Stephens ca. 1863 - 1895
R.D. Pressick 1895 - 1896 (afterwards station master at Dawlish)
J.R. Martin 1896 - 1900 (afterwards station master at Devonport)
Albert William Lofting from 1901  (formerly station master at Starcross)
J.R.H. Tucker ca. 1912 - 1919 (afterwards station master at Liskeard)
Herbert John Hawes 1919 - 1927 
Thomas Charles Evans 1927 - 1938 (afterwards station master at Camborne)
W. Reynolds 1938 - 1943 (afterwards station master at Hayle)
H. Jane 1943 - 1948
W. Clemence 1948 - 1961
W.F.B. Strong Sept 1961 - not known

Platform layout
The opposite face of this platform used to be served by trains on the  branch line.

Services

References

Further reading

 The records of the railway companies can be consulted at The National Archives at Kew.

External links

Railway stations in Cornwall
Former Great Western Railway stations
Railway stations in Great Britain opened in 1859
Railway stations served by Great Western Railway
Lostwithiel
DfT Category F1 stations